Pereleski is a rural locality (a posyolok) in Chernyakhovsky District, Kaliningrad Oblast, Russia. Population:

References 

Rural localities in Kaliningrad Oblast